Dysosma is a group of herbaceous perennials in the Berberidaceae or barberry family described as a genus in 1928. It is native to China and Indochina.

The genus is not universally recognised by this name, as some authorities include the plants in the genus Podophyllum. Dysosma is recognised by other authorities as including only those Podophyllum species which originate in China. Dysosma grow as perennial, rhizomatous wildflowers on the damp and humus-rich floors of deciduous forests. The single umbrella-shaped leaves grow on an erect stem that usually stands , but with height varying with species. The leaves may be completely green or mottled and flecked with purple; they have an entire or deeply serrated edge depending on species. The flowers are nodding and in a range of colours. The fruit is a dark red berry.

Species
 Dysosma aurantiocaulis - Yunnan, possibly Myanmar - Endangered
 Dysosma delavayi - Guizhou, Sichuan, Yunnan, Shaanxi 
 Dysosma difformis - Guangxi, Guizhou, Hubei, Hunan, Sichuan, Vietnam
 Dysosma furfuracea - Yunnan
 Dysosma guangxiensis - Guangxi
 Dysosma lichuensis - Hubei
 Dysosma majoensis - Guangxi, Guizhou, Hubei, Sichuan, Yunnan
 Dysosma majorensis - Guangxi, Guizhou, Hubei, Sichuan
 Dysosma pleiantha - Anhui, Fujian, Guangdong, Guangxi, Henan, Hubei, Hunan, Jiangxi, Sichuan, Taiwan, Zhejiang
 Dysosma tsayuensis - Tibet -  Endangered
 Dysosma veitchii - Guizhou, Sichuan, Yunnan  - Endangered
 Dysosma versipellis - Anhui, Guangdong, Guangxi, Guizhou, Henan, Hubei, Hunan, Jiangxi, Shanxi, Yunnan, Zhejiang - Endangered

References

Berberidaceae
Flora of China
Garden plants
Berberidaceae genera